Stephens County Courthouse may refer to:

 Stephens County Courthouse (Georgia), Toccoa, Georgia
Stephens County Courthouse (Texas), Breckenridge, Texas, listed on the National Register of Historic Places